New Island Books is an independent Irish publisher of literary fiction, poetry, drama, biography, and books on politics and social affairs.

History
It was founded as Raven Arts Press in 1977 by Dermot Bolger. In 1982, Raven Arts closed and was re-founded as New Island Books by Bolger with Edwin Higel and Fergal Stanley.

It is a member of Publishing Ireland (Clé), the support organisation of Irish publishing, sharing information, expertise and resources.

Successes
It has published several bestsellers including Joseph O'Connor's The Secret World of the Irish Male and Nuala O'Faolain's memoir of the life of an Irishwoman, Are You Somebody?.

It has been described as "a major force in Irish publishing.

Authors

 Dermot Bolger 
 Anthony Cronin
 Patrick Galvin
 Roddy Doyle
 Nick Hornby
 Martin Malone
 Cecelia Ahern
 Aidan Higgins
 Joseph O'Connor
 Tom MacIntyre
 Christine Dwyer Hickey
 Maeve Binchy
 Mary Kenny
 Richard Downes
 Stephen Price
 Adi Roche
 Rose Doyle
 Nuala Ní Dhomhnaill
 Paul Durcan
 Philip Casey
 Maeve Brennan
 Myles Dungan
 Glenn Patterson
 Brian Lynch
 Nuala Ní Chonchúir 
 Nuala O'Faolain.

References

External links
New Island Books
Raven Arts Press archive, Special Collections, University of Delaware Library, Newark, Delaware.

Publishing companies established in 1977
Book publishing companies of Ireland
Publishing companies of the Republic of Ireland